The following is a list of notable events and releases of the year 1919 in Norwegian music.

Events

Deaths

Births

 February
 15 – Stephan Henrik Barratt-Due, violinist and music teacher (died 1985).

 March
 2 – Bjørn Fongaard, composer, guitarist, and teacher (died 1980).

 July
 12 – Jon Bratt Otnes, opera singer and diplomat (died 2004).
 27 – Per Hjort Albertsen, composer (died 2015).

 September
 8 – Johan Kvandal, composer and music critic (died 1999).
 28 – Fred Lange-Nielsen, jazz bassist and vocalist (died 1989).

 November
 25 – Øistein Sommerfeldt, composer (died 1994).

See also
 1919 in Norway
 Music of Norway

References

 
Norwegian music
Norwegian
Music
1910s in Norwegian music